Spencer Leigh may refer to:

Spencer Leigh (actor) (born circa 1963), a British TV and film actor.
Spencer Leigh (radio presenter) (born 1945), a BBC Radio Merseyside presenter and author.